is a former Japanese football player.

Club statistics

References

External links

1989 births
Living people
Association football people from Ibaraki Prefecture
Japanese footballers
J2 League players
Mito HollyHock players
Association football midfielders